Gleiritsch is a river of Bavaria, Germany. It passes through the village Gleiritsch and flows into the Pfreimd near Trausnitz.

See also
List of rivers of Bavaria

References

Rivers of Bavaria
Rivers of Germany